Mitchell Dahood (Anaconda, Montana, 1922- Rome 8 March 1982) was an American Jesuit Hebraist and Bible scholar. Dahood grew up in Concord, New Hampshire, and studied at Johns Hopkins University in Baltimore. He moved to Rome in 1957 where he became professor of the Hebrew language, and of the Ancient Near East languages Ugaritic and Eblaite, at the Pontifical Biblical Institute.

Among his works was a three-volume translation of the Psalms with commentary, originally published by Doubleday, and then re-published by Yale University Press in the Anchor Yale Bible Series. Dahood was known within the field of biblical studies for using information from Ugarit and the Ugaritic language (discovered first in 1929) as the basis for proposed new interpretations of passages in the Psalms, with sometimes controversial results.

References

1922 births
1982 deaths
People from Anaconda, Montana
American Hebraists
20th-century American Jesuits
Johns Hopkins University alumni
Linguists from the United States
American expatriates in Italy
Catholics from Montana
20th-century linguists